Van Laer is a surname. Earlier spellings include Van Laar and Van Leer. Notable people with the surname include:

Alexander Theobald Van Laer (1857–1920), American painter
Arnold Johan Ferdinand Van Laer (1869–1955), Archivist, translator, editor, and historian of Dutch-language documents from New Netherland
Pieter van Laer (1599 – c. 1642), Dutch Golden Age painter
Roeland van Laer (1598 – after 1635), Dutch Golden Age painter
Wannes Van Laer (born 1985), Belgian sailor

Surnames of Dutch origin